The Journal of Applied Philosophy is a peer-reviewed academic journal published by Wiley-Blackwell on behalf of the Society for Applied Philosophy and edited by Elizabeth Brake (Rice University). It covers a broad spectrum of issues in all areas of applied philosophy, including work on the environment, medicine, science, engineering, policy, law, politics, economics, and education.

According to the Journal Citation Reports, the journal has a 2017 impact factor of 1.018, ranking it 24th out of 51 journals in the category "Ethics".

Journal for Applied Philosophy Annual Essay Prize 

The Journal of Applied Philosophy awards an annual prize of £1,000 to the best article published in the year's volume.

 2017: Natasha McKeever “Is the Requirement of Sexual Exclusivity Consistent with Romantic Love?”
 2016: Federico Picinali “Base Rates of Negative Traits: Instructions for Use in Criminal Trials”
 2015: Cheshire Calhoun “Geographies of Meaningful Living”
 2014: Christopher Morgan-Knapp “Economic Envy”
 2013: Daniel Friedrich “A Duty to Adopt”
 2012: Avery Kolers “Floating Provisos and Sinking Islands”
 2011: Jakob Elster “How Outlandish Can Imaginary Cases Be?”

Society for Applied Philosophy Annual Lectures 
Each year since 2010, the Journal of Applied Philosophy has published the Annual Lecture hosted by the Society of Applied Philosophy.

2017: Philip Pettit presented the lecture, 'Three Mistakes about Doing Good (and Bad)'. Read the article here. 
2016: Arthur Ripstein presented the lecture, 'Reclaiming Proportionality'. Read the article here. 
2015: Shelley Kagan presented the lecture, 'What's Wrong with Speciesism?'. 
2014: Julia Annas presented the lecture, 'Applying Virtue to Ethics'. Read the paper based on this talk here.
2013: Larry Temkin presented the lecture, 'Universal Healthcare in the Developing World: Solution or Siren? Some Preliminary Thoughts'. Read the paper based on this lecture here.
2012: Joseph Raz presented the lecture 'Death in Our Life'. The paper based on this lecture can be read here.
2011: Amartya Sen presented the lecture 'The Global Reach of Human Rights'. The paper based on this talk can be read here.
2010: Philip Kitcher presented the lecture 'Militant Modern Atheism'. The paper based on this talk can be found here.

See also 
 List of ethics journals

References

External links 
 

Philosophy journals
Applied philosophy
Publications established in 1984
Wiley-Blackwell academic journals
English-language journals
Quarterly journals